Axel Teichmann (born 14 July 1979) is a German cross-country skiing coach and former skier.

Background
Teichmann started cross-country skiing at the age of ten. He completed his secondary education at Bad Lobenstein and, from 1993, at Oberhof.  Since graduation in 1998, he has been aided in his sporting career by the German armed forces as a military athlete. In addition to professional sport, Teichmann studies electrical engineering at FernUniversität Hagen.

Career
Teichmann competed at the 2002, the 2010, and the 2014 Winter Olympics. He was sick for a large part of the 2005–06 season and failed to compete in the 2006 Winter Olympics. Due to the Germans selection criteria of either an Olympic medal or a top 10 finish in the World Cup, Teichmann, who won the overall World Cup in 2004–05, was left out of the German A-team for the 2006–07 season. Teichmann was still able to compete, only he received less financing and did not train with the other elite members.

In June 2006 Teichmann had leg surgery for an injury he had, but he was given a modified wheelchair while he recovered. The wheelchair was made with rollerskis, so that he could still train.

He won silver with Tim Tscharnke in the Team Sprint at the 2010 Winter Olympics in Vancouver.

After the 50 km freestyle race at the 2014 Winter Olympics in Sochi, he announced his immediate retirement from the sport.

Cross-country skiing results
All results are sourced from the International Ski Federation (FIS).

Olympic Games
 2 medals – (2 silver)

World Championships
 8 medals – (2 gold, 5 silver, 1 bronze)

World Cup

Season titles
 2 titles – (1 overall, 1 distance)

Season standings

Individual podiums
13 victories – (8 , 5 ) 
30 podiums – (20 , 10 )

Team podiums
 8 victories – (6 , 2 ) 
 19 podiums – (13 , 6 )

References

External links
  
 
 
 
 
 

1979 births
Living people
German male cross-country skiers
Olympic cross-country skiers of Germany
Olympic silver medalists for Germany
Olympic medalists in cross-country skiing
Cross-country skiers at the 2002 Winter Olympics
Cross-country skiers at the 2010 Winter Olympics
Cross-country skiers at the 2014 Winter Olympics
Medalists at the 2010 Winter Olympics
FIS Nordic World Ski Championships medalists in cross-country skiing
FIS Cross-Country World Cup champions
Tour de Ski skiers
Recipients of the Silver Laurel Leaf
People from Saalburg-Ebersdorf
People from Bezirk Gera
Sportspeople from Thuringia